The Acropolis is a mountain in the Central Highlands region of Tasmania, Australia. Situated in the Cradle Mountain-Lake St Clair National Park, the mountain is part of the Du Cane Range.

It is a major feature of the national park, and is a popular venue with bushwalkers and mountain climbers.

The word acropolis means a high city or citadel.

See also

 List of highest mountains of Tasmania

References

External links
 Parks Tasmania
 

Acropolis
Acropolis
Acropolis